The 249th Rifle Division was raised in 1941, within days of the German invasion, as a standard Red Army rifle division, and served for the duration of the Great Patriotic War in that role. The division was formed twice, first from a cadre of NKVD soldiers that went on to become the 16th Guards Rifle Division after distinguishing themselves in the fighting for Toropets during the Soviet counteroffensive in the winter of 1941-42. The second formation was largely made up of ethnic Estonians and was known as the 249th Estonian Rifle Division. It fought under that name for the duration, and shortly after the German surrender became the 122nd Guards Rifle Division.

1st Formation 
The division began organizing on June 26, 1941, in the Urals Military District. It was one of a series of rifle divisions numbered in the 240–260 range that were built on cadres taken from the NKVD, in this case internal troops. Its order of battle, based on the first wartime shtat (table of organization and equipment) for rifle divisions, was as follows:
 917th Rifle Regiment
 921st Rifle Regiment
 925th Rifle Regiment
 779th Artillery Regiment
 307th Antitank Battalion
 326th Antiaircraft Battery (later 526th Antiaircraft Battalion)
 328th Reconnaissance Company
 417th Sapper Battalion
 267th Medical/Sanitation Battalion
 247th Chemical Defense (Anti-gas) Company
 65th Motor Transport Company (later 470th)
 287th Field Bakery
 812th Field Postal Station
Major General German Tarasov, who would lead the division for the rest of its existence, took command on July 2. The division was assigned to 31st Army of Reserve Front until October, giving its troops more time to form up and train than many other divisions in that period. During that month it was assigned to 22nd Army in Kalinin Front, which was rebuilding after being partly overrun by the Germans in September. In December the 249th was transferred again to 27th Army, which was soon renamed 4th Shock Army, in time for the general Soviet counteroffensive against the German Army Group Center starting on December 5.

The division led the attack of its Army in January 1942, advancing over 100 km through deep snow and without regular supplies until capturing the German supply base at Toropets on January 21. During this advance it played a leading role in the encirclement and destruction of the 189th Infantry Regiment, together with the 2nd Battalion of Artillery Regiment 181 and the 3rd Company of Engineer Battalion 181 of the 81st Infantry Division at Okhvat. Other German forces were cut off in the Demyansk and Kholm pockets. For its efforts in this offensive, the 249th Rifle Division was re-designated as the 16th Guards Rifle Division on February 16.

2nd Formation 
A new division, originally designated the 423rd Rifle Division, then the 2nd Estonian Rifle Division, began forming on Feb. 10, 1942 in the Chelyabinsk Oblast of the Urals Military District. On Feb. 28 it was finally re-designated as the 249th Estonian Rifle Division. Its order of battle remained the same as the 1st Formation, with the addition of an unnumbered mortar battalion.

The division was recruited from Estonians who had fled eastwards in front of the German invasion, including members of the Communist Party of Estonia. Recruitment was slow given a restricted manpower pool; by early March there were only 3,000 men on strength and the commander was not designated until May 6. Eventually over half of the division was descendants of Estonians who had emigrated to Russia in the previous century, and of non-Estonians. The division stayed in the Urals until September, then was shipped to the Moscow Military District where it joined the 7th Estonian and the 19th Guards Rifle Divisions to form the 8th Estonian Rifle Corps. The 249th remained in that Corps for the duration.

In November the corps was assigned to Kalinin Front, and reinforced 3rd Shock Army in its attack against German Third Panzer Army in and around the city of Velikiye Luki. Its first battle was costly, and in spite of receiving the 162nd Machinegun Battalion and a training battalion as replacements in December, by the end of the battle on Feb. 1, 1943, the 249th was at about 50% strength, with a total of 4,213 officers and men. The division and its corps remained directly under Front command (in October Kalinin Front became 2nd Baltic Front) for the remainder of the year, attacking alongside 4th Shock Army towards Vitebsk in the Battle of Nevel in November and December.

In February 1944, 8th Corps was reassigned to the reserves of Leningrad Front, following the breaking of the German siege and that Front's advance towards the Baltic States. Once the 249th entered Estonia it could draw on the local population for replacements. By August it was at a strength of 7,946 officers and men, making it a very strong rifle division for that stage of the war. In September, 8th Corps became part of 8th Army, which was clearing the coasts of Estonia and Latvia as well as the islands offshore. On Oct. 6, the 1st Battalion of the 925th Rifle Regiment, along with the 328th Reconnaissance Company, staged an amphibious assault on one of these islands, mounted on US Lend Lease DUKW amphibious trucks of the 283rd Special Purpose Truck Battalion. Two men of the 925th, Lt. A. G. Repson and Jr. Sgt. N. N. Matyashin, were named as Heroes of the Soviet Union for this operation. During this year the division as a whole was awarded the honorific "Tartu" for assisting in the liberation of that city, as well as the Order of the Red Banner on October 22.

In February 1945, 8th Corps returned to 2nd Baltic Front, now in Lithuania. On Mar. 17 a strength return showed the 249th still with 8,996 officers and men, nearly twice the strength of the average 1945 Red Army rifle division. They spent the last two months of the war helping to keep guard over the German forces trapped in the Kourland Pocket. Nearly two months after V-E Day, on June 28, the 8th Estonian Rifle Corps became the 41st Guards Rifle Corps, and the 249th Estonian Rifle Division was renamed the 122nd Guards Rifle Division.

References

Citations

Bibliography
 
 
 p. 113
 pp. 226

External links 
German Fedorovich Tarasov
Iogan Iakovlevich Lombak
HSU Nikolai Nikolaievich Matyashin

249
Military units and formations established in 1941
Military units and formations disestablished in 1945
Military units and formations awarded the Order of the Red Banner
1942 establishments in the Soviet Union
1945 disestablishments in the Soviet Union